The women's team sprint competition at the 2022 UEC European Track Championships was held on 11 and 12 August 2022.

Results

Qualifying
All teams advanced to the first round.

First round
The first two team raced for gold medal, the third and fourth fastest teams raced for the bronze medal.

Finals

References

Women's team sprint
European Track Championships – Women's team sprint